Mona Marshall is an American voice actress, known for her work in a number of cartoons, anime shows, films and video games. Her major credits include South Park, where she voices many of the female characters on the show; Fraggle Rock: The Animated Series, CBS Storybreak, and Digimon. She has also appeared on-stage for television shows such as Cheers and Who's the Boss?

Career
Marshall has a theatre background and trained for the stage.  When she was teaching fifth grade, the mother of one of her students suggested she enroll in a voice-over class taught by the late Daws Butler, voice of Yogi Bear and Quick Draw McGraw.

She is often cast in the roles of young male characters. Her roles have included parts in not only in American animated television series and several animated feature films, but also in Japanese anime.

Her most notable roles in American cartoons are Sheila Broflovski (1999–present, after original voice actress Mary Kay Bergman committed suicide) and Linda Stotch on the popular television show South Park as well as the title character in Doraemon and Kite, the main protagonist of the 2002 video game series .hack for PlayStation 2. Marshall voiced the talking bear Koby the Study Buddy and she also provided the English voice for the title character in the El Chavo: The Animated Series.

Outside of voice acting, Marshall has coached others on the craft, and has worked on a singing career with solo songs she would perform on stage.

Filmography

Anime

 Ah My Buddha - Sakura
 Arc the Lad - Monkey, Poco
 Armitage: Dual-Matrix - Julian Moore
 Apocalypse Zero - Harara Hagakure
 Bakuto Sengen Daigunder - Makoto
 Battle Athletes Victory
  - Ichimatsu Yanagida
 Battle B-Daman - Bull
 B-Daman Crossfire - Riki Ryugasaki 
 Black Jack - Nomad, Michelle (Young)
 Bleach - Ichigo Kurosaki (Child), Mika
 Blue Exorcist - Konekomaru Miwa 
 Bobobo-bo Bo-bobo - Young Bo-bobo, Lambada, LOVE
 Carried by the Wind: Tsukikage Ran - Ran Tsukikage
 Cowboy Bebop - Wen 
 Digimon Adventure - Koushiro "Izzy" Izumi
 Digimon Adventure 02 - Koushiro "Izzy" Izumi 
 Digimon Tamers - Terriermon/Gargomon/Rapidmon/MegaGargomon (Shared with Dave Wittenberg)/Gummymon
 Digimon Data Squad - Frigimon, Young Thomas, King Drasil 2-9000-WZ  
 Eagle Riders - Mickey Dougan
 Eiken - Grace Lin
 El Hazard: The Magnificent World - Nahato
 FAKE - Bikky, Maria, Cindy Irving
 Fate/stay night: Unlimited Blade Works - Shirou Emiya (Young)
 Fate/Zero - Shirou Emiya
 Fighting Spirit- Chana
 Flint the Time Detective - Getalong, Snapper of the Cardians
 Fushigi Yūgi - Boushin, Mrs. Yuki
 Gate Keepers - Young Shun
 Ghost in the Shell: S.A.C. 2nd GIG - Street Kid (RED DATA)
 Ghost in the Shell: S.A.C. 2nd GIG - Chai
 Ghost Slayers Ayashi - Kyosai Kawanabe
 Hand Maid May - Masato Zin
 Idaten Jump - Ayumu Yamato
 Kanokon - Kouta Oyamada
 Kashimashi: Girl Meets Girl - Tomari Kurusu
 Kekkaishi - Yumeko "Mother-san" Hananokoji
 Kuromajo-san ga Toru!! - Chiyoko Kurotori
 Kyo Kara Maoh! - Wolfram von Bielefeld
 Last Exile - Lucciola
 Lupin III - Baranco
 Macross Plus - Various characters 
 MÄR - Emokis
 Magic Knight Rayearth - Ascot
 Mahoromatic - Feldlance, Young Suguru Misato
 Tranzor Z - Toad
 Mobile Suit Gundam 0080: War in the Pocket - Chay, Telcott
 Moribito: Guardian of the Spirit - Chagum
 Naruto - Inari, Young Haku, Ryugan
 Naruto: Shippuden - Biwako Sarutobi
 New Getter Robo - Raikou Minamoto
 Nightwalker: The Midnight Detective - Kasumi (Young), Yoko
 Noein - Asuka Kaminogi
 Nodame Cantabile - Chiyo Sakata, Makiko Tanaka, Shizuka, Shinichi Chiaki (Young)
 Omishi Magical Theater: Risky Safety - Yuya Fukami
 Otogi Zoshi (TV series) - Kintaro
 Rurouni Kenshin - Okita Sōji, Oguni Suzume
 Saber Marionette J Again - Otaru Mamiya
 Saiyuki Reload - Ginkaku
 Samurai X - Tsukayama Yutarō (the Sony Dub version of Rurouni Kenshin)
 Scrapped Princess - Sutton
 S-CRY-ed - Akira Terada
 Someday's Dreamers - Gossiping Mage, Haru, Junko, Mother, Ms. Kuniko, Office Clerk, Orphanage Headmaster, Yasuyuki
 Tenchi Muyo! GXP - Ryoko, Ryo-Ohki, Noike Kamiki Jurai, Suiren
 The Big O - Winter Night Phantom
 Trigun - Elizabeth, Kaite Trevisick
 Vampire Knight: Guilty - Young Kaname (Ep. 3)
 Vampire Princess Miyu - Matsukaze
 Vandread - Meia's Fama, Chisato's Mother, Fat Lady,
 Wild Arms: Twilight Venom - Mirabelle's Mother
 Zatch Bell! - Yuuta, Hirofume
 Zenki - Mrs. Kazue

Animation

 CBS Storybreak - Various
 Chuck Norris: Karate Kommandos - Too-Much
 Chucklewood Critters - Rusty, Bearbette, Bluebell
 Dumbo's Circus - Matilda Dinkum 
 El Chavo - Miss Pinster, Chavo
 G.I. Joe: A Real American Hero - Vena, Cadet Demming, Mrs. Fairmont, Sally Fairmont, Fairmont Boy, Hawaiian Girl
 Inspector Gadget (Pilot episode) - Penny
 Jackie Chan Adventures - Po Kong, Bai Tsa, Vanessa Barone, Jade's mother
 James Bond Jr. - Tracy Milbanks, Tiara Hotstones
 Jem and the Holograms - D'Nisha Cross
 K10C: Kids' Ten Commandments - Miriam, Ephraim, HannahLoopdidoo - Female Characters
 My Little Pony - Scuttle Bug
 Rainbow Brite - Red Butler, Patty O'Green, Canary Yellow
 Rambo and the Forces of Freedom - Kat
 Rocket Power - Skinny Kid
 Rugrats - Additional Voices
 Saban's Adventures of Oliver Twist - Oliver Twist
 Spider-Man (1981) - Betty Brant
 Spiral Zone - Katerina Anastasia, Duchess Dire
 Squirrel Boy - Esther Flatbottom
 The Canterville Ghost - Ted Otis
 The Little Mermaid TV series - Aquata
 The Mummy: The Animated Series - Emperor Jin Wu
 The New Adventures of Mighty Mouse - Cow Announcer
 The Smurfs - Weepy Smurf
 The Transformers - Luisa (Fire on The Mountain), Aron (Child's Play), Hassan (Aerial Assault)
  TOME: The Terrain of Magical Expertise - Bishipp
 Wee Sing - "Animal/Classic for Kids" Songs - Singaling
 WordWorld - Tiger
 Zentrix - TZ/Little Rock

Films

 The Adventures of Scamper the Penguin – Narrator, Gracie (Scamper's Mom), Cowboy, Louie, Various Children Penguins
 Adventures in Voice Acting - Herself
 Arthur's Missing Pal - Rosie the Truck Driver
 Blue Exorcist: The Movie - Konekomaru Miwa
 Cardcaptor Sakura Movie 2: The Sealed Card - Syaoran Li
 Cats Don't Dance - Additional Voices
 Chicken Little - Female Poodle #2/Additional Voices
 Cloudy with a Chance of Meatballs - Woman #3/Additional Voices
 Dawn of the Dead - ADR group (Zombie #8)
 Despicable Me 2 - Additional Voices
 Despicable Me 3 - Additional Voices
 The Dragon That Wasn't (Or Was He?) - Kit Cat, Miss Fluff, Mrs. Tusker
 Frozen - Additional Voices
 Gorgeous - Bu (English dub)
 Here Comes Peter Cottontail: The Movie - Mother Mouse
 Here Come the Littles - Mrs. Evans
 Horton Hears a Who! - Additional Voices
 Hotel Transylvania 2 - Additional Voices
 Hotel Transylvania 3 - Additional Voices
 Inside Out - Additional Voices (Mom's Disgust and Thought Worker)
 Justin and the Knights of Valour - Various Townspeople 
 Little Alvin and the Mini-Munks - Lalu's Toilet
 Minions - Woman #1
 Mobile Suit Gundam F91 - Nye Fletchen
 Mondo Holocausto! - Mother Superior
 Monsters, Inc. - Leaderboard Voice/Additional Voices
 Monsters University - Emmet/Additional Voices
 Ninku - Fusuke
 Only Yesterday - Taeko's Grandmother
 Onmyoji - Suke Hime
 Rainbow Brite and the Star Stealer - Canary Yellow, Castle Creature, Patty O'Green, Red Butler, Spectran, Witch
 Sakura Wars: The Movie - Leni Milchstrasse
 Spirited Away - Additional Voices
 Street Fighter Alpha: The Movie - Shun
 Tangled - Additional Voices
 The Cat Returns - Additional Voices
 The Emoji Movie - Additional Voices
 The Hunchback of Notre Dame - Female Villager
 The Lorax - Additional Voices
 The Nutcracker and the Mouseking - One of the Mouse Guards
 The Princess and the Frog - Additional Voices
 The Secret Life of Pets - Additional Voices
 The Star - Additional Voices
 The Snow Queen - John
 The Toy Warrior - Jinoo
 The Wild - Various Female Dung Beetles
 Thumbelina: A Magical Story - Noble, Mrs. Garrison (Maya's Mom), Angela (the Good Witch), Cassandra (the Bad Witch), Pixie, The Frog Witch, Bridesmaid #1, Bridesmaid #3
 Treasure Planet - Birdbrain Mary
 Wreck-It Ralph - Additional Voices
 Young Pocahontas - Pocahontas

Video games

 24: The Game - Additional Voices
 Avatar: The Game - Na'vi, Rai Uk's Mother
 Brave Fencer Musashi - Musashi
 Conflict: Global Terror - Carrie Sherman and female reporter  
 Drakengard Angelus (English Dub)
 Drakengard 3 Gabriella (English Dub)
 Guild Wars Factions - Countess Danika Zu Heltzer
 Lightning Returns: Final Fantasy XIII - Additional Voices 
 Master of Monsters: Disciples of Gaia - "Master" - (uncredited)
 Ratchet & Clank - Helga, Ed(wina), Helpdesk Girl
 Ratchet & Clank: Going Commando - Help Matron
 Ratchet: Deadlocked - Eugene, Lucy
 Rocket Power: Beach Bandits - Eric Golem Jr.
 South Park Let's Go Tower Defense Play -  Red McArthur
 South Park: Tenorman's Revenge - Foxy the Fox
 South Park: The Stick of Truth - Sheila Broflovski, Linda Stotch, Red McArthur, Additional Voices
 South Park: Phone Destroyer - Sheila Broflovski, Red McArthur, Additional Voices
 South Park: The Fractured but Whole - Sheila Broflovski, Linda Stotch, Red McArthur, Additional Voices 
 Spectrobes: Origins The Granstream Saga - Korky (was miscredited as the voice of Gandor)
 Wild Arms 5'' - Carol Anderson

References

 Mona Marshall Interview on Anime Dream
 Mona Marshall Interview on 91.8 The Fan

External links
 
 
 

Living people
20th-century American actresses
21st-century American actresses
Place of birth missing (living people)
Year of birth missing (living people)
American voice actresses
American television actresses
American video game actresses